"Delilah" is a song recorded by Welsh singer Tom Jones in December 1967. The lyrics were written by Barry Mason, and the music by Les Reed, who also contributed the title and theme of the song. It earned Reed and Mason the 1968 Ivor Novello award for Best Song Musically and Lyrically.

Music and lyrics

Although the song is a soulful number set in triple metre, the underlying genre may be considered to be a power ballad, rising to a pitch of A4 on the final note. Produced by Peter Sullivan, Jones' version features a big-band accompaniment set to a flamenco rhythm. Flamenco was a surprising choice, since there is no reference to Spain anywhere in the song. There are similarities to the plot of the opera Carmen by French composer Georges Bizet, in which the soldier, Don José, stabs gypsy girl, Carmen, to death when she tells him she is leaving him for another man.

The song tells the story of a man who passes his girlfriend's window and sees her inside making love to another man.  He waits outside all night, and then confronts her in the morning, only to have her laugh in his face. He stabs her to death, and then waits for the police to come break down the door and arrest him. The lyrics unfold from the killer's point of view, and are filled with his, often contradictory, emotions. He speaks of Delilah in possessive terms, but also refers to himself as her "slave." He asks his dead girlfriend to "forgive" him, but still clearly sees himself as having been wronged by her.

When Jones performed the song on The Ed Sullivan Show, in 1968 the censors (unsuccessfully) attempted to insist that the line "At break of day when the man drove away" be changed to "At break of day I was still 'cross the way", as the original version implied he had spent the night with Delilah. Jones later described the proposed change as "such bullshit".

In a two-year court case in the High Court of Justice, 1983 -M- No.1566, Barry Mason's ex-wife Sylvan Whittingham, the daughter of Bond film Thunderball screenwriter, Jack Whittingham, claimed she had written half the lyrics of "Delilah" and several other songs. The legal battle was settled out of court in 1986.

Chart performance
Tom Jones' recording reached No. 1 in the charts of several countries, including Germany and Switzerland. It reached No 2 in the British charts in March 1968 and was the sixth-best selling single of that year. The US Billboard chart records its highest position as 15.

Charts

Weekly charts

Year-end charts

Certifications and sales

Use in Welsh rugby 
Shortly after its release, "Delilah" became an unofficial anthem in Welsh rugby. As early as 1971, Max Boyce's own hit song, Hymns and Arias referenced "Delilah"s popularity alongside more traditional Welsh hymns:

The song's popularity saw it become part of official matchday performances at Wales matches, especially those at the old National Stadium. On 17 April 1999, Jones performed Delilah as part of the pre-match build-up to Wales' victory over England at Wembley Stadium in the 1999 Five Nations Championship.
In February 2023, it was removed because of its description of a murder.

Controversy 
The Welsh Rugby Union regularly played the song at the Millennium Stadium before international matches, often displaying the lyrics on large screens. On 20 June 2003, Senedd Member Helen Mary Jones publicly raised concerns that the song "glorifies violence against women". The song's co-writer, Barry Mason, responded to Jones' criticism, stating: "It's sad, isn't it? She's being silly. To say fans are wrong to sing Delilah insults their intelligence. Nobody listens to the lyrics. This woman would be better off talking about unemployment in Wales." The Welsh Rugby Union replied that their use of the song was in response to public demand, adding: "Fans sing this song without concern for the lyrics."

Further criticism of the song's use in Welsh rugby came in 2014, when politician and singer Dafydd Iwan wrote an article on the meaning of song lyrics. Iwan noted that choirs and fans inside the stadium would sing Delilah alongside his own folk song, "Yma o Hyd", and the Christian hymns "Cwm Rhondda" and "Calon Lân". Iwan stated that while each song was "great to sing", the four together formed a strange mix. Iwan's article stated that while he had written "Yma o Hyd" about the historic survival of the Welsh nation against all odds, Delilah was "a song about murder and it does tend to trivialise the idea of murdering a woman and it's a pity these words now have been elevated to the status of a secondary national anthem. I think we should rummage around for another song instead of 'Delilah'".

Iwan's article led to much debate across the UK, with The Guardian erroneously reporting that Iwan was calling for the song to be banned. In a BBC interview, Tom Jones responded to the debate by saying that the song was "not a political statement" and that "I love to hear it being sung at Welsh games, it makes me very proud to be Welsh that they're using one of my songs." The Welsh Rugby Union also responded that they had condemned "violence against women" and had "taken a lead role in police campaigns to highlight and combat the issue." A spokesman added that the organisation was "willing to listen to any strong public debate on the issue of censoring the use of Delilah but we have not been aware of any groundswell of opinion on this matter". They also compared the lyrics to other well-known tragedies, such as Romeo and Juliet. Following these responses, Iwan wrote a letter to the Guardian pointing out their error, adding that "banning songs is not something I would ever advocate."

Response 
In 2015, the Welsh Rugby Union removed the song from its half-time entertainment and playlist for international matches. The Union again clarified their position on 1 February 2023, prior to the start of the 2023 Six Nations Championship. The Union reiterated that "Delilah" was no longer included in playlists for Wales matches and that guest choirs had also been requested not to feature the song in more recent years. This announcement was immediately criticised by some, including Wales wing Louis Rees-Zammit, who tweeted: "All the things they need to do and they do that first…" The statement was seen by some as a response to allegations of a "toxic culture" within the WRU, raised in a BBC Wales documentary. Richard Marx performed the song live in Cardiff the following evening. Marx opened his performance of the song by stating that "I am not remotely minimising violence, or especially violence against women, but there are a lot of things that we all could be doing to help the situation, other than banning Delilah."

The Welsh Rugby Union's actions were commended by the Chief Constable of Dyfed–Powys Police, while singer Nick Cave stated: "I can't get too animated by the fact that Delilah has been banned. I understand there is a principle here, but on some level I like the fact that some songs are controversial enough to be outlawed. It fills me with a kind of professional pride to be a part of the sometimes contentious business of songwriting. It's cool. I just wish it was a more worthy song to be awarded that greatest of honours, indeed that supreme privilege, of being banned." After watching an online video of a Welsh male voice choir singing the song, Cave added "I'm sorry to report that listening to this version of the song did make me feel like murdering someone, primarily the Welsh male choir. Or maybe it wasn't the choir, but the song itself that disturbed me – I just don’t like it."

Other uses

Association Football
Supporters of Stoke City adopted "Delilah" as their club anthem. The origins are disputed with one version dating it precisely to an away game at Derby on 11 April 1987. Others claim it was sung by Stoke City fans as early as the mid 1970s. Some of the song's original lyrics were adapted for the football terraces, but the essence of the song remained the same.

Film
The song featured in the 1990 film Edward Scissorhands.

Music
On 4 June 2012 Jones performed the song for the Queen's Diamond Jubilee Concert.

References

External links
 

1960s ballads
1968 singles
Football songs and chants
Irish Singles Chart number-one singles
Murder ballads
Number-one singles in Finland
Number-one singles in Germany
Number-one singles in Switzerland
Number-one singles in France
Number-one singles in Belgium
Number-one singles in South Africa
Number-one singles in Spain
Songs about crime
Songs about death
Songs written by Barry Mason
Songs written by Les Reed (songwriter)
Stoke City F.C.
Tom Jones (singer) songs
1968 songs
Decca Records singles
Parrot Records singles
Songs about infidelity
Schlager songs
Song recordings produced by Peter Sullivan (record producer)
Obscenity controversies in music
Pop ballads